Cellular agriculture focuses on the production of agricultural products from cell cultures using a combination of biotechnology, tissue engineering, molecular biology, and synthetic biology to create and design new methods of producing proteins, fats, and tissues that would otherwise come from traditional agriculture. Most of the industry is focused on animal products such as meat, milk, and eggs, produced in cell culture rather than raising and slaughtering farmed livestock which is associated with substantial global problems of detrimental environmental impacts (e.g. of meat production), animal welfare, food security and human health. Cellular agriculture is field of the biobased economy. The most well known cellular agriculture concept is cultured meat.

History 

Although cellular agriculture is a nascent scientific discipline, cellular agriculture products were first commercialized in the early 20th century with insulin and rennet.

On March 24, 1990, the FDA approved a bacterium that had been genetically engineered to produce rennet, making it the first genetically engineered product for food. Rennet is a mixture of enzymes that turns milk into curds and whey in cheese making.  Traditionally, rennet is extracted from the inner lining of the fourth stomach of calves. Today, cheese making processes use rennet enzymes from genetically engineered bacteria, fungi, or yeasts because they are unadulterated, more consistent, and less expensive than animal-derived rennet.

In 2004, Jason Matheny founded New Harvest, whose mission is to "accelerate breakthroughs in cellular agriculture". New Harvest is the only organization focused exclusively on advancing the field of cellular agriculture and provided the first PhD funding specifically for cellular agriculture, at Tufts University.

By 2014, IndieBio, a synthetic biology accelerator in San Francisco, has incubated several cellular agriculture startups, hosting Muufri (making milk from cell culture, now Perfect Day Foods), The EVERY Company (making egg whites from cell culture), Gelzen (making gelatin from bacteria and yeast, now Geltor), Afineur (making cultured coffee beans) and Pembient (making rhino horn). Muufri and The EVERY Company were both initially sponsored by New Harvest.

In 2015, Mercy for Animals created The Good Food Institute, which promotes plant-based and cellular agriculture.

Also in 2015, Isha Datar coined the term "cellular agriculture" (often shortened to "cell ag") in a New Harvest Facebook group.

On July 13, 2016, New Harvest hosted the world's first international conference on cellular agriculture in San Francisco, California. The day after the conference, New Harvest hosted the first closed-door workshop for industry, academic, and government stakeholders in cellular agriculture.

Research tools 
Several key research tools are at the foundation of research in cellular agriculture. These include:

Cell lines 
A fundamental missing piece in the advancement of cultured meat is the availability of the appropriate cellular materials. While some methods and protocols from human and mouse cell culture may apply to agricultural cellular materials, it has become clear that most do not. This is evidenced by the fact that established protocols for creating human and mouse embryonic stem cells have not succeeded in establishing ungulate embryonic stem cell lines.

The ideal criteria for cell lines for the purpose of cultured meat production include immortality, high proliferative ability, surface independence, serum independence, and tissue-forming ability. The specific cell types most suitable for cellular agriculture are likely to differ from species to species.

Growth media 
Conventional methods for growing animal tissue in culture involves the use of fetal bovine serum (FBS). FBS is a blood product extracted from fetal calves. This product supplies cells with nutrients and stimulating growth factors, but is unsustainable and resource-heavy to produce, with large batch-to-batch variation. Cultured meat companies have been putting significant resources into alternative growth media.

After the creation of the cell lines, efforts to remove serum from the growth media are key to the advancement of cellular agriculture as fetal bovine serum has been the target of most criticisms of cellular agriculture and cultured meat production. It is likely that two different media formulations will be required for each cell type: a proliferation media, for growth, and a differentiation media, for maturation.

Scaling technologies 
As biotechnological processes are scaled, experiments start to become increasingly expensive, as bioreactors of increasing volume will have to be created. Each increase in size will require a re-optimization of various parameters such as unit operations, fluid dynamics, mass transfer, and reaction kinetics.

Scaffold materials 
For cells to form tissue, it is helpful for a material scaffold to be added to provide structure. Scaffolds are crucial for cells to form tissues larger than 100 µm across. An ideal scaffold must be non-toxic for the cells, edible, and allow for the flow of nutrients and oxygen. It must also be cheap and easy to produce on a large scale without the need for animals.

3D tissue systems 
The final phase for creating cultured meat involves bringing together all the previous pieces of research to create large (>100 µm in diameter) pieces of tissue that can be made of mass-produced cells without the need for serum, where the scaffold is suitable for cells and humans.

Applications 
While the majority of discussion has been around food applications, particular cultured meat, cellular agriculture can be used to create any kind of agricultural product, including those that never involved animals to begin with, like Ginkgo Biowork's fragrances.

Meat 

Cultured meat (also known by other names) is a meat produced by in vitro cell cultures of animal cells. It is a form of cellular agriculture, with such agricultural methods being explored in the context of increased consumer demand for protein.

Cultured meat is produced using tissue engineering techniques traditionally used in regenerative medicines. The concept of cultured meat was introduced to wider audiences by Jason Matheny in the early 2000s after he co-authored a paper on cultured meat production and created New Harvest, the world's first nonprofit organization dedicated to in-vitro meat research.

Cultured meat may have the potential to address substantial global problems of the environmental impact of meat production, animal welfare, food security and human health. Specifically, it can be thought of in the context of the mitigation of climate change.

In 2013, professor Mark Post at Maastricht University pioneered a proof-of-concept for cultured meat by creating the first hamburger patty grown directly from cells. Since then, other cultured meat prototypes have gained media attention: SuperMeat opened a farm-to-fork restaurant called "The Chicken" in Tel Aviv to test consumer reaction to its "Chicken" burger, while the "world's first commercial sale of cell-cultured meat" occurred in December 2020 at the Singapore restaurant "1880", where cultured meat manufactured by the US firm Eat Just was sold.

While most efforts in the space focus on common meats such as pork, beef, and chicken which comprise the bulk of consumption in developed countries, some new companies such as Orbillion Bio have focused on high end or unusual meats including Elk, Lamb, Bison, and the prized Wagyu strain of beef. Avant Meats has brought cultured grouper fish to market  as other companies have started to pursue cultivating additional fish species and other seafood.

The production process is constantly evolving, driven by multiple companies and research institutions. The applications of cultured meat have led to ethical, health, environmental, cultural, and economic discussions. In terms of market strength, data published by the non-governmental organization Good Food Institute found that in 2021 cultivated meat companies attracted $140 million in Europe alone.
Currently cultured meat is served at special events and few high end restaurants, mass production of cultured meat has not started yet.

In 2020, the world's first regulatory approval for a cultivated meat product was awarded by the Government of Singapore. The chicken meat was grown in a bioreactor in a fluid of amino acids, sugar, and salt. The chicken nuggets food products are ~70% lab-grown meat, while the remainder is made from mung bean proteins and other ingredients. The company pledged to strive for price parity with premium "restaurant" chicken servings.

Dairy 

 Perfect Day is a San Francisco-based startup that started as the New Harvest Dairy Project and was incubated by IndieBio in 2014. Perfect Day is making dairy from yeast instead of cows. The company changed its name from Muufri to Perfect Day in August 2016.

 New Culture is a San Francisco-based startup that was incubated by IndieBio in 2019. New Culture makes mozzarella cheese using casein protein (dairy protein) made by microbes instead of cows.

 Real Vegan Cheese based in the San Francisco Bay-area is a grass-roots, non-profit Open Science collective working out of two open community labs and was spun out of the International Genetically Engineered Machine (iGEM) competition in 2014. Real Vegan Cheese are making cheese using casein protein (dairy protein) made by microbes instead of cows.

 Formo, based in Germany, is a startup making dairy products using microbial precision fermentation.
Imagindairy is attempting to create dairy from bioengineered yeast.

Eggs 

The EVERY Company is a San Francisco-based startup that started as the New Harvest Egg Project and was incubated by IndieBio in 2015. The EVERY Company is making egg whites from yeast instead of eggs.

Gelatin 

Geltor is a San Francisco-based startup that was incubated by IndieBio in 2015. Geltor is developing a proprietary protein production platform that uses bacteria and yeast to produce gelatin.

Coffee 
In 2021, media outlets reported that the world's first synthetic coffee products have been created by two biotechnology companies, still awaiting regulatory approvals for near-term commercialization. Such products – which can be produced via cellular agriculture in bioreactors and for which multiple companies' R&D have acquired substantial funding – may have equal or highly similar effects, composition and taste as natural products but use less water, generate less carbon emissions, require less labor and cause no deforestation. Products that equal naturally grown coffee on the chemical molecular level technically would not be "coffee substitutes" but differ only in their method of production – and hence be "lab-grown coffee".

Organizations working on cellular coffee include:

Afineur is a Brooklyn-based startup using biotechnology and smart fermentations to improve the nutritional profile and taste of plant-based food, starting with craft coffee.

Horseshoe crab blood 

Sothic Bioscience is a Cork-based startup incubated by IndieBio in 2015. Sothic Bioscience is building a platform for biosynthetic horseshoe crab blood production. Horseshoe crab blood contains limulus amebocyte lysate (LAL), which is the gold standard in validating medical equipment and medication.

Fish 
Cellular agriculture could be used for commercial fish feed.

Finless Foods is working to develop and mass manufacture marine animal food products.
Wild Type is a San Francisco-based startup focused on creating cultured meat to address items such as climate change, food security, and health.

Fragrances 

Ginkgo Bioworks is a Boston-based organism design company culturing fragrances and designing custom microbes.

Silk 

Spiber is a Japan-based company decoding the gene responsible for the production of fibroin in spiders and then bioengineering bacteria with recombinant DNA to produce the protein, which they then spin into their artificial silk.
Bolt Threads is a California-based company creating engineered silk fibers based on proteins found in spider silk that can be produced at commercial scale. Bolt examines the DNA of spiders and then replicates those genetic sequences in other ingredients to create a similar silk fiber. Bolt's silk is made primarily of sugar, water, salts, and yeast. Through a process called wet spinning, this liquid is spun into fiber, similar to the way fibers like acrylic and rayon are made.

Leather 

Modern Meadow is a Brooklyn-based startup growing collagen, a protein found in animal skin, to make biofabricated leather.

Pet food 
Clean Meat cluster lists Because Animals, Wild Earth and Bond Pet Foods as participants in developing pet foods that use cultured meat.

Wood 
In 2022, scientists reported the first 3D-printed lab-grown wood. It is unclear if it could ever be used on a commercial scale (e.g. with sufficient production efficiency and quality).

Issues

Academic programs

New Harvest Cultured Tissue Fellowship at Tufts University 
A joint program between New Harvest and the Tissue Engineering Research Center (TERC), an NIH-supported initiative established in 2004 to advance tissue engineering. The fellowship program offers funding for Masters and PhD students at Tufts university who are interested in bioengineering tunable structures, mechanics, and biology into 3D tissue systems related to their utility as foods.

Conferences

New Harvest Conference 
New Harvest brings together pioneers in the cellular agriculture and new, interested parties from industry and academia to share relevant learnings for cellular agriculture's path moving forward. The Conference has been held in San Francisco, California, Brooklyn, New York, and is currently held in Cambridge, Massachusetts.

Industrializing Cell-Based Meats & Seafood Summit 
The 3rd Annual Industrializing Cell-Based Meats & Seafood Summit is the only industry-led forum uniting key decision-makers from biotech and food tech, leading food and meat companies, and investors to discuss key operational and technical challenges for the development of cell-based meats and seafood.

International Scientific Conference on Cultured Meat 
The International Scientific Conference on Cultured Meat began in collaboration with Maastricht University in 2015, and brings together an international group of scientists and industry experts to present the latest research and developments in cultured meat. It takes place annually in Maastricht, The Netherlands.

Good Food Conference 
The GFI conference is an event focused on accelerating the commercialization of plant-based and clean meat.

Cultured Meat Symposium 
The Cultured Meat Symposium is a conference held in Silicon Valley highlighting top industry insights of the clean meat revolution.

Alternative Protein Show 
The Alternative Protein Show is a "networking event" to facilitate collaboration in the "New Protein Landscape", which includes plant-based and cellular agriculture.

New Food Conference 
The New Food Conference is an industry-oriented event that aims to accelerate and empower innovative alternatives to animal products by bringing together key stakeholders. It is Europe's first and biggest conference on new-protein solutions.

In the media

Books 
Clean Meat: How Growing Meat Without Animals Will Revolutionize Dinner and the World is a book about cellular agriculture written by animal activist Paul Shapiro (author). The book reviews startup companies that are currently working towards mass-producing cellular agriculture products.
Meat Planet: Artificial Flesh and the Future of Food by Benjamin Aldes Wurgaft is the result of five years researching cellular agriculture, and explores the quest to generate meat in the lab, asking what it means to imagine that this is the future of food. It is published by the University of California Press.
Where do hot dogs come from? A Children's Book about Cellular Agriculture by Anita Broellochs, Alex Shirazi and Illustrated by Gabriel Gonzalez turns a family BBQ into a scientific story explaining how hot dogs are made with cellular agriculture technologies. The book was launched on Kickstarter on July 20, 2021.

Podcasts 
 Cultured Meat and Future Food is a podcast about clean meat and future food technologies hosted by Alex Shirazi, a mobile User Experience Designer based in Menlo Park, California, whose current projects focus on retail technology. The podcast features interviews with industry professionals from startups, investors, and non-profits working on cellular agriculture.

Similar fields of research and production

 Microbial food cultures and genetically engineered microbial production (e.g. of spider silk or solar-energy-based protein powder)
 Controlled self-assembly of plant proteins (e.g. of spider silk similar plant-proteins-based plastics alternatives)
 Cell-free artificial synthesis (see Biobased economy#Agriculture)
 Imitation foods (e.g. meat analogues and milk substitutes)

References

External links
 Overview of relevant bibliography
New Harvest
Cellular Agriculture Society

Further reading 
 Clean meat, consumer attitudes and the transition to a cellular agriculture food economy
 A Closer Look at Cellular Agriculture and the Processes Defining It
 As lab-grown meat advances, U.S. lawmakers call for regulation
 CELLULAR AGRICULTURE: A WAY TO FEED TOMORROW’S SMART CITY?
 Cellular Agriculture, Intentional Imperfection And 'Post Truth': The Transformative Food Trends Of 2017
 The 4 Key Biotechnologies Needed to Get Cellular Agriculture to Commercialization
 Cellular agriculture: Growing meat in a lab setting
 How Might Cellular Agriculture Impact the Livestock, Dairy, and Poultry Industries?

 
Biological engineering
Meat